Bioc may refer to:

 Bioc (village)
 Malonyl-CoA O-methyltransferase, an enzyme